The Ven. Hugh Henry Molesworth Bevan, MA (2 August 1884 – 15 January 1970) was an Anglican priest: he was Archdeacon of Ludlow from 1948  to 1960.

He was educated at Shrewsbury School; The Queen's College, Oxford and Ripon College, Cuddesdon. He was ordained Deacon in 1908; and Priest in 1909. After curacies at, Holy Trinity, Paddington and St Luke's Church, Chelsea he was a Lecturer in Divinity at Whitelands College. He held incumbencies in East Acton, Hammersmith and Stanton Lacy.

Notes

1884 births
People educated at Shrewsbury School
Alumni of The Queen's College, Oxford
Alumni of Ripon College Cuddesdon
Archdeacons of Ludlow
1970 deaths